Ryaga Krishnaiah (born 13 September 1954), known as R. Krishnaiah, is current Member of Parliament from Rajya Sabha of YSR Congress Party from 2022. 

Krishnaiah was elected as MLA representing L.B. Nagar constituency in 2014 from Telugu Desam Party. He has been fighting for the last 35 years for the rights of Backward Classes and their increase in the standard of living through via politics, education, and law.  He led the protests along with agitations and fought not only with the government of Andhra Pradesh but also with Central Government of India, private educational institutes managements in Andhra Pradesh either through strikes, processions, protestations, boycotting the colleges, hunger strikes, fast-unto-death protests and legally in state-level High Courts and Supreme Court of India. He has also fought for social justice, reservations in schools and colleges along with scholarships for poor students to pursue education in junior, degree and university colleges. He also fought with success for the reservations in village and Mandal level elections for backward classes.

Political career
Krishnaiah joined Telugu Desam Party in 2014 and he was elected to Telangana Assembly from the L.B. Nagar constituency. In 2018 Assembly elections he had contested unsuccessfully on a Congress ticket from the Miryalaguda and later he quit the Congress party and joined YSR Congress Party on 17 May 2022 after he was declared as a Rajyasabha member. He was finalized as YSR Congress candidate to Rajya Sabha from Andhra Pradesh on 17 May 2022.

References 

 
 
  
 http://www.goudsinfo.com/famouspersons.htm

External links
 rkrishnaiah.com 
 OBC Rules information www.obcguru.com by Shailendra Wagadre

1954 births
Living people
Telugu Desam Party politicians
Telangana MLAs 2014–2018
People from Ranga Reddy district